Joely Collins (born Joely Meri Bertorelli; August 8, 1972) is a British-Canadian actress and producer. She is the daughter of Andrea Bertorelli and of English musician Phil Collins.

Early life
Born and raised largely in Vancouver, British Columbia, Collins studied at the Vancouver Youth Theatre, and later at London's Royal Academy of Dramatic Arts. She was adopted by her mother's husband, Phil Collins, upon their marriage in 1975. They later had one child, son Simon (born in 1976). She was named Canada's "Best Leading Actress" at the age of 22 for her work on the television series Madison. She appeared on the long-running drama Cold Squad. In 2009, she co-founded StoryLab Productions and produced the award-winning feature film Becoming Redwood.

Actress Lily Collins is her paternal step-sister, born to her adoptive father Phil Collins and his second wife Jill Tavelman after he and her mother Andrea Bertorelli divorced in 1980.

Collins won the award for Best Actress in a Canadian Film at the Vancouver Film Critics Circle Awards 2004 for The Love Crimes of Gillian Guess.

Personal life
Collins married Dutch-born Stefan Buitelaar on August 23, 2008, in Leiden, Netherlands. On October 26, 2009, Collins gave birth to their daughter, Zoë Amelie.

Filmography

Film

Television

References

External links
Official website

Phil Collins
1972 births
Living people
20th-century Canadian actresses
21st-century Canadian actresses
Actresses from Vancouver
Best Actress in a Drama Series Canadian Screen Award winners
Canadian adoptees
Canadian film actresses
Canadian people of English descent
Canadian television actresses